The Sweden national futsal team represents Sweden in international futsal competitions such as the FIFA Futsal World Cup and the European Championships and is controlled by the Swedish Football Association. The team played their first official match in December 2012 against France in Gothenburg. One month later, Sweden played their first competitive games and took three impressive victories in the qualification round for the 2014 European Championship.

History
In 2005, an unofficial Swedish national team played a mini-tournament in Tehran against Iran and Japan. The games were sanctioned by FIFA, but the Swedish Football Association (SvFF) has not recognized these games as official. The unofficial national team has also played matches against Catalonia, which were sanctioned by the rival of FIFA, Asociación Mundial de Fútbol de Salón (AMF). In 2010, SvFF started a two-year-long process to boot a national team. Per Broberg was hired as coach, and on 11 December 2012, an official Swedish national team played their first game in front of their home crowd in the Lisebergshallen against France in Gothenburg which they lost 2–3.

Tournament records
Sweden officially made their debut in an international competition at the UEFA Futsal Euro 2014 qualifying round in Andorra la Vella, Andorra on 23–26 January 2013.

FIFA Futsal World Cup

UEFA European Futsal Championship

Nordic Futsal Cup

All-time team record
As of 10 June 2022.

Players
Current squad
The following players were called up for the friendly matches against Romania on 23 and 24 January 2022, respectively.Caps and goals are correct as of 16 January 2022.''

Recent call-ups
The following players have also been called up to the Portugal squad within the last 12 months.

INJ Player withdrew from the squad due to an injury.

Statistics

Attendances
Top five attendances in home matches.

References

External links
 Official page
 Sweden's page at UEFA.com

 
European national futsal teams
National team